Westernport Refinery was an oil refinery operated by BP at Crib Point adjacent to Westernport Bay in the Australian state of Victoria. It was constructed from 1963 and started operations in 1966. Its last day of operation was 1 April 1985.

Construction of the refinery began in December 1963. It was designed with an initial throughput of 1,500,000 tons of crude oil per annum, and able to be expanded to 2,200,000 tons per annum. It was served by a jetty with two berths for import of crude oil and export of refined products in bulk.

Legal dispute

Westernport Refinery was the centre of a significant legal dispute which went to appeal to the Privy Council of the United Kingdom as the highest available appellate court at the time. The dispute arose at the beginning of 1970 and after many court cases and appeals, was finally determined by the Privy Council in July 1977. The focus of the dispute was payment of rates under various agreements with both local and state governments, after BP restructured its corporate arrangements.

References

Industrial buildings completed in 1965
Industrial buildings in Victoria (Australia)
Oil refineries in Australia
1966 establishments in Australia
1985 disestablishments in Australia